The Houdini is a New Zealand sailing dinghy that was designed by John Welsford as a cruiser and first built in 2011.

The boat's designer intended it as an "escape machine" and so named it in honour of Harry Houdini.

Production
The design is supplied in the form of plans. It has been built by amateur builders and also by some professional builders on a custom basis.

Design

The boat was designed for camping on-shore and provides stowage space to take a large amount of camping gear. It can accommodate four people for camping-cruising or up to seven people for day sailing. The design has sleeping accommodation for two adults under a boom tent.

The Houdini is a recreational sailboat, built predominantly of wood, with a plywood hull and wooden spars and trim. The prototype used bamboo spars. It has a lug sail rig and can be fitted with a mizzen mast and sail as a yawl. It has a pronounced sheer, a plumb stem, a vertical transom, a transom-hung rudder controlled by a tiller and a retractable centreboard. It displaces . A cuddy cabin is optional.

The boat may be optionally fitted with an outboard engine for docking and maneuvering.

Boats have also been completed with gaff rigs and sloop rigs.

See also
List of sailing boat types

Similar sailboats
Naiad 18

References

External links

Dinghies
2010s sailboat type designs
Sailboat type designs by John Welsford